Grace Baptist Christian School is a private Christian school located in Tifton, Georgia, United States.

Baptist schools in the United States
Christian schools in Georgia (U.S. state)
Schools in Tift County, Georgia
Tift County Schools
Private high schools in Georgia (U.S. state)
Private middle schools in Georgia (U.S. state)
Private elementary schools in Georgia (U.S. state)